Red House Painters (also known as Bridge or Red House Painters II to distinguish it from the first eponymous album, also known as Rollercoaster or Red House Painters I) is the third album by the group Red House Painters, released on October 18, 1993 by 4AD. The album is made up of songs from the same recording sessions for Rollercoaster.

At the beginning of the album opener "Evil," the faint laughter of Mark Kozelek and the barely audible voice of a woman playfully saying "No" can be heard. The album includes two covers: a sunny version of "I Am a Rock" by Simon and Garfunkel, and Francis Scott Key's "The Star-Spangled Banner", which displays an off-beat dark humor. An acoustic version of the song "New Jersey" was on Red House Painters I. In the US, 4AD added the Shock Me EP as bonus tracks to the CD when the RHP catalog was reissued in 1999, to bring the total number of tracks to 12.

Track listing

Release history

Notes
 Images by Simon Larbalestier.

"I Am a Rock"/"New Jersey" single
Although no commercial singles were ever released from the album, a promotional-only CD single was issued for "I Am a Rock" in October 1993. In the US, a one-track promo featuring the radio edit was released; similarly, in the UK, a double A-side promo single, backed with "New Jersey" (Electric Version), was issued.

Warner Bros./4AD, PRO-CD-5498:
 "I Am a Rock" (Edit) – 4:44

4AD, RHP 1 CD (UK):
 "I Am a Rock" (Edit) – 4:44
 "New Jersey" (Electric Version) – 4:24

Trivia 
- On track 6, Uncle Joe, the lines:

"And I am not very well read

And did you say that I will lose my house

And can you spare me of my pain

And can you spare me of my tears"

form a lyrical joke referencing the name of the band. Reading the last word of each line results in "Red House Pain Tears", effectively the name Red House Painters.

References

Red House Painters albums
1993 albums
4AD albums
Albums produced by Mark Kozelek